Ivan Pace Jr. (born December 16, 2000) is an American football linebacker. He played college football for the Miami RedHawks before transferring to the Cincinnati Bearcats in 2022, where he was named a unanimous All-American and the AAC Defensive Player of the Year.

High school career
Pace Jr. attended Colerain High School in Cincinnati, Ohio. He played linebacker and running back in high school. He committed to Miami University to play college football.

College career

Miami (OH) 
Pace Jr. played in 13 games his true freshman year at Miami in 2019, recording 19 tackles and seven sacks. Six of those sacks game against Akron, which tied the NCAA record for most sacks in a game. In 2020, he started all three games in the Covid-19 pandemic shortened season and had 26 tackles. In 2021, he had 125 tackles, four sacks and an interception.

Cincinnati 
Pace Jr. transferred to the University of Cincinnati after the 2021 season. He joined his brother, Deshawn, who also plays linebacker for the team. He was a starter his first year at Cincinnati in 2022.

References

External links
Cincinnati Bearcats bio
Miami RedHawks bio

2000 births
Living people
All-American college football players
American football linebackers
Cincinnati Bearcats football players
Miami RedHawks football players
Players of American football from Cincinnati